Daeng may refer to:

In Thai language
Daeng means "red" in the Thai language. This word is present in many location names in Thailand: Example: Sala Daeng Station

Title
Daeng or Daing, a Malay hereditary title of Bugis - Malay Patrilineal Royal descent

Plants
Daeng (Xylia xylocarpa), a perennial tree.